Hans Brøchner Bruun (18 July 1793 - 1 April 1863) was a Danish merchant and politician. He ran a large trading house in Assens on the island of Funen. He was by royal appointment a member of the 1848 Danish Constituent Assembly.

Early life and education
Bruun was born in Fredericia, the son of Bertel Bruun (1767–1827) and Magdalene Barbara Brøchner (1768–1831). He received a commercial education in his father's company. His father was the owner of several successful factories in Viborg and Fredericia.

Career
In 1826 Bruun took over the operation of the ferry service from Assens on Funen. His youngest brother, Søren Wedege Bruun, ran a trading house in the same town. Bruun continued the firm after his brother's early death in 1837. The company, N. M. & F. Plum, developed into one of the largest trading houses in the Danish provinces.

Politics
Bruun chaired Assens Town Council from 1839 to 1857. He was elected for Roskilde Provincial Assembly in 1835–48 as a representative of the smaller market towns in Odense County, although he was absent at the 1844 assembly, and was appointed for the 1848 Danish Constituent Assembly by the king.

Personal life

Bruun married Hanne Antonie Jacobine Christiane Plum (17 February 1798 - 19 January 1878), a daughter of parish priest, and later bishop, Frederik Plum (1760–1834) and Marie Sophia Munk (1765–1829), on 6 June 1818 in Odense. They had the following children:
 Bertel Bruun (22 January 1820,- 6 August 1894)
 Marie Sophie Bruun (22 November 1822 - 26 November 1847)
 Frederik Plum Bruun (1824)
 Magdalene Barbara Bruun (1827)
 Hanne Antonie Bruun (1832-1833)

References

External links

 Hans Brøchner Bruun

19th-century Danish businesspeople
19th-century Danish politicians
People from Assens Municipality
1793 births
1863 deaths
People from Fredericia